Sega SC-3000 is a character set developed by Sega Corporation for the SC-3000 home computer.

Character sets 

� Not in Unicode

� Not in Unicode

References 

Character sets
Sega